Patrick Gallagher (born 1 December 1946) is a former Irish politician. He was a member of Sinn Féin the Workers Party, the Workers' Party and Democratic Left political parties. He was elected to Dáil Éireann as a Sinn Féin the Workers Party Teachta Dála (TD) for the Waterford constituency at the February 1982 general election. He lost his seat at the November 1982 general election. He was an elected member of Waterford City Council from the 1970s to 1990s.

A journalist, Gallagher established his own free-sheet newspaper Waterford Today.

References

1946 births
Living people
Democratic Left (Ireland) politicians
Workers' Party (Ireland) TDs
Members of the 23rd Dáil
Local councillors in County Waterford
Politicians from County Waterford